The marsh frog (Pelophylax ridibundus) is a species of water frog native to Europe and parts of western Asia.

Description 
The marsh frog is the largest type of frog in most of its range, with males growing to a size around 100 mm (3.9 in) SVL and females slightly larger (4 in) SVL. There is a large variation in colour and pattern, ranging from dark green to brown or grey, sometimes with some lighter green lines; a lighter line on the back is generally present. The frog will usually be darker coloured in early spring to absorb heat more efficiently.

Tadpoles can reach up to 190 mm (7.3 in) in length, but this usually occurs in places with long winters where the tadpole has time to grow.

Distribution and habitat 
They occur in a large part of Europe starting from western France and spreading out into the Middle East and about a quarter into Russia. There are also isolated populations in Saudi Arabia and the Russian Far East, along with some introduced populations in the United Kingdom and other places.

These frogs are very lenient in their habitats, and are able to inhabit a majority of different types of water bodies. Marsh frogs hibernate during the winter either underwater or in burrows, and are able to use the magnetic field of the Earth to locate breeding ponds.

Diet 
Adult marsh frogs have a large head that is able to devour a wide variety of prey, mostly arthropods and other invertebrates. In an analysis of 53 adults in Thrace, flies made up 40% and beetles 20% of their diet. These frogs have been found to climb onto water buffalo so they could eat the flies attracted to it, hinting at a possible mutualistic relationship.

As tadpoles, they eat a wide range of organic matter including algae, detritus, decaying plants, and dead animals.

Hybridogenesis 

There are known three hybridogenetic hybrids of the marsh frog:

 edible frog Pelophylax kl. esculentus (usually genotype RL):pool frog P. lessonae (LL) × P. ridibundus (RR)

 Graf's hybrid frog Pelophylax kl. grafi (PR):Perez's frog P. perezi (PP) × P. ridibundus (RR) orPerez's frog P. perezi (PP) × edible frog P. kl. esculentus (RE)(it is unclear which one crossing was the primary hybridization)

 Italian edible frog Pelophylax kl. hispanicus (RB):Italian pool frog P. bergeri (BB) × P. ridibundus (RR)
Their populations are maintained however through other crossings by hybridogenesis. In places where they were introduced, marsh frogs may pose a threat to the native Pelophylax by diluting the gene pool, but there is evidence that although they may hybridize they do not affect the overall population that greatly.

References

External links 

 
 Listen to Pelophylax ridibundus call sound

Pelophylax
Amphibians of Afghanistan
Amphibians of Iran
Amphibians of the Middle East
Vertebrates of the Arabian Peninsula
Amphibians of Europe
Amphibians described in 1771
Taxa named by Peter Simon Pallas